Chunseong, born Lee Chang-nim (이창림, 李昌林; March 30, 1891 – August 22, 1977), was a Korean Buddhist monk, scholar, poet, writer, and philosopher. His courtesy name was Muaedoin (무애도인, 無碍道人) or Chunseong (춘성, 春性).

Early life 
Chunseong was born on March 30, 1891, in Inje county, Gangwon Province. His father was Lee In-oh (이인오, 李仁五) and his mother was Lady Park of Milyang (밀양박씨). He was their fifth son. Chunseong's family line was of the Pyeongchang Lee clan (평창이씨, 平昌李氏). His father was a tenant farmer. Although Chunseong's birth name was Lee Chang-nim (이창림, 李昌林), his Dharma name was Chunseong (춘성, 春城). He was often called Chunseong Chunseong (春城 春性).

Early monk life 
In his early years, Chunseong went to the Baekdamsa (백담사), a famous Buddhist temple in Inje. He begged to be a pupil, but abbess Manhae Han Yong-un (만해 한용운, 萬海 韓龍雲) rejected him because he was too young. Eventually, at age fifteen, he became a Buddhist monk, apprenticing under Manhae Han Yong-un.

Chunseong was required to read through Hwaeomgyeong (화엄경, 華嚴經) and Geumganggyeong (금강경, 金剛經). He studied them so well that he could recite the Hwaeomgyeong backwards. Because of this, he earned the nickname "Hwaeom monk" (화엄법사, 華嚴法師).

March 1 movement 
In November 1918, Chunseong's teacher published Yusim (translated as "whole mind"), a series of magazines that written to make Buddhism appeal to the youth. The following year, Yong-un was imprisoned for his involvement with the March 1 movement. Chunseong remained dutiful to his teacher while he was in prison and was the only head monk who regularly visited and sent over food and supplies. Even though his temple had plenty of firewood, Chunseong refused to use any heat during winter and slept in a freezing cold room: "My teacher is shivering in a cold cell in Seodaemun Prison because he was captured by the Japanese while fighting for independence. So how can I, his disciple, sleep in the comfort of a warm room?"

Satire and humor

My hometown is my mother's vagina 
Right after the Korean War, it was illegal to cut down trees. Even though it was freezing cold weather, no one could gather firewood to heat themselves. So Chunseong decided to cut down some wood for firewood as well as to make repairs to the dilapidated temple. He got caught and was arrested the Japanese police for violating forestry laws. During his interrogation at the Uijeongbu Police Station, a detective asked Chunseong, "what is your address?" to which he replied, "my mother's vagina." The detective thought Chunseong was strange so he rephrased his question. "Where is your hometown?" Again, Chunseong replied saying, "my mother's vagina." Despite numerous attempts of asking these questions, Chunseong only responded with, "my mother's vagina."

This infuriated the detective so he told Chunseong to stop messing around and give a proper answer. So he asked, "Where is your legal domicile?" This time Chunseong responded with, "my father's penis." At this point, the police realized that they weren't able to get through to him so they sent him away, assuming he wasn't mentally sound.

Jesus' resurrection 
One day, after visiting a temple, he was on his way back to Uijeongbu on a bus. On the ride, there was a Christian fanatic who was shouting into a loudspeaker, "Believe in Jesus Christ who died and resurrected! If you believe in Him, you will go to heaven!" This Christian saw that Chunseong was dressed in a monk's robe, and decided to stand in front of him and yell these words.

Chunseong decided to yell back, "What did you say? He died and rose again? The only thing that dies and rises again is my penis every morning!"

The Christian felt awkward and got off on the next station to get away from the situation.

The commander of monks 
Chunseong enjoyed his fair share of alcoholic drinks and often drank beer and makgeolli (which he referred to as gokcha, or grain drinks).

One night, he had too much to drink and got caught violating curfew hours by a police officer. The police asked "Who are you?"  Chunseong said, "I am a Jungdaejang (translated to "company commander")! The police officer went closer to him and upon seeing that he wasn't in the military, but was instead dressed in a monk's robe, he said, "Why would you lie saying that you were a company commander?" Chunseong replied, "I am the commander (daejang) of monks (jung), so am I not a Jungdaejang?"

The joke was a play on words because "Jung" means monk and "Daejang" means commander. Upon hearing this joke, the police officer let Chunseong get on his way because he thought he was a strange man.

Teaching a lesson to an old spinster 
An elderly woman who regularly sought Chunseong to hear his lectures had a spinster for a granddaughter because her standards were too high. The elderly women sent her granddaughter to Chunseong so that he could teach her a lesson. The granddaughter showed up to meet him wearing a miniskirt. Upon seeing her, Chunseong said, "How can my big thing fit into your tiny thing?"

The granddaughter's face grew bright red as she ran out of the room crying out that he was a  "sham of a monk."

She returned to her home and was upset at her grandmother for sending her to see this monk. What he really meant was "How can his large teaching fit into your tiny mind" Upon hearing this, the spinster felt ashamed that she had jumped to a sexual conclusion.

Practice 
Throughout his life, Chunseong slept without a quilt or blanket. In the Korean language, the spelling of quilt is "Yibul" (이불). Because the word "Yibul" had another meaning, "to separate from Buddha," Chunseong refused to sleep with a blanket (이불, 離佛, to separate Buddha).

Chunseong did not believe in owning things. Even when his followers gave him clothes, he would give them to beggars and vagrants he encountered. Because of this, he had to hide his naked body until he could return to the temple at night. He also generously gave away all the money he received from his followers.

Korean War 
In the 1940s, he was told to cooperate with the law of Sōshi-kaimei (창씨개명, 創氏改名) and change his name to comply with the Japanese colonial authorities, but he refused.

In 1944, he went to the Doksungsan Sudeok Temple, where he studied under Mangong Song Wolmyon (만공 송월면, 萬空 宋月面). Mangong was top of the Korean Ganhwaseon (看話禪, 간화선). He trained for Mangong. In 1946 he returned to Mangwol Temple (망월사, 望月寺) as its head. Chunseong was attacked for hypocrisy, rigorism, pretended philanthropy and formalism. In July 1949, he participated in funerals for Baikbum Kim Gu (백범김구 국민장, 白凡金九 國民葬)

In 1950, during the Korean War, he escaped and returned to Mangwol Temple. At the end of the Korean War, he returned to his monks with bashfulness.

During the war, he preserved the Ganhwaseon tradition and the Mangwol Temple. In the 1950s, he became abbot of the Mangwol Temple, Shinheung Temple and the Bomun Temple.

Last years 
In the 1960s, the South Korean regent was Park Chung-hee. In 1964, Chunseong was invited by him to Chungwadae (청와대, 靑瓦臺) since the First Lady, Yuk Young-su was a devout Buddhist. During his visit, Chunseong said, "the Lady Yuk was born from her mother's vagina," which caused many to panic.

In 1970, he again went to Mangwol temple. From 1970 to 1973 he practiced asceticism for Jangjabulwa (장좌불와, 長坐不臥), In 1973 he participated in public campaigns for safe driving and sobriety.

Death  
In 1977, he died in Mangwolsa, in Uijongbu. He was 86 years old.
   
At his funeral, he did not have a coffin. Instead, his corpse was covered with a straw mat. His funeral was short, with a short funeral march, during which the monks sang the song, "Grief of a drifter" (나그네 설움). His ashes are enshrined at the Bongkuk Temple, which is located in Seongnam.

Long after his death, Chunseong's name was a social taboo for South Korea because of his controversial words and actions along with the social influence of Confucianism. That taboo eased in the 1990s, but in 2002, Doal Kim Yong-ok used one of his anecdotes for a program on EBS. In 2004, South Korean broadcasting programs began to report more of his words and actions.

See also
Korean Buddhism
Korean Seon

References

Sources
Doh Jin-Soon: Great Monk & Great Learning (큰 스님 큰 가르침) (Seoul; Moonwae, 2006)
Kim Kwang-sik: Choonseong:Mooaedoin's Story (춘성:무애도인 삶의 이야기) (Seoul; SaeSsak, 2009)
Samjoong: The More Story Behind (숨겨왔던 많은 이야기들) (Seoul, KukbooCarma, 2009)

External links
춘성 스님 
망월사 춘성선사 – 한겨레  
춘성:한국역대인물종합정보 
도올 TV 강의서 육두문자 인용 구설수 – 오마이뉴스 
도올 TV 강의 육두문자 논란- 한국일보  
[아침을 열며] 인간에 대한 믿음 

1891 births
1977 deaths
Korean independence activists
Korean revolutionaries
People from Inje County
South Korean anti-communists
South Korean Buddhist monks
South Korean educators
South Korean writers
20th-century Korean philosophers
20th-century Buddhist monks